Paducah is a town in Cottle County, Texas, United States. The population was 1,186 at the 2010 census, down from 1,498 in 2000. It is the county seat of Cottle County. It is just south of the Texas Panhandle and east of the Llano Estacado.

History
The town was named for Paducah, a city in western Kentucky. Richard Potts, a settler from Paducah, Kentucky, offered land to new residents in exchange for voting to name the town Paducah and make it the county seat. Paducah officially became the county seat in 1892 and was incorporated in 1910.

Geography
Paducah is located south of the center of Cottle County.

Three U.S. highways intersect in the center of town. U.S. Route 83 leads north  to Childress and south  to Guthrie, while U.S. Route 70 leads east  to Crowell and west  to Matador. U.S. Route 62 follows US 83 north out of town and US 70 to the west.

Climate
The Köppen climate classification subtype for this climate is BSk (subtropical steppe climate).

Demographics

2020 census

As of the 2020 United States census, there were 1,063 people, 575 households, and 287 families residing in the town.

2000 census
As of the census of 2000, there were 1,498 people, 650 households, and 421 families living in the town. The population density was 985.0 people per square mile (380.5/km2). There were 820 housing units at an average density of 539.2 per square mile (208.3/km2). The racial makeup of the town was 79.57% White, 11.21% African American, 7.61% from other races, and 1.60% from two or more races. Hispanic or Latino of any race were 20.29% of the population.

There were 650 households, out of which 28.0% had children under the age of 18 living with them, 49.7% were married couples living together, 12.3% had a female householder with no husband present, and 35.1% were non-families. 34.0% of all households were made up of individuals, and 23.5% had someone living alone who was 65 years of age or older. The average household size was 2.25 and the average family size was 2.86.

In the town, the age distribution of the population shows 24.0% under the age of 18, 6.0% from 18 to 24, 20.3% from 25 to 44, 23.0% from 45 to 64, and 26.6% who were 65 years of age or older. The median age was 45 years. For every 100 females, there were 82.2 males. For every 100 females age 18 and over, there were 78.4 males.

The median income for a household in the town was $23,333, and the median income for a family was $30,652. Males had a median income of $26,184 versus $16,131 for females. The per capita income for the town was $15,778. About 15.4% of families and 20.4% of the population were below the poverty line, including 30.0% of those under age 18 and 17.8% of those age 65 or over.

Government
Republican David Spiller, an attorney from Jacksboro in Jack County, has since March 2021 represented Paducah and Cottle County in the Texas House of Representatives.

Education
The town is served by the Paducah Independent School District and is home to the Paducah High School Dragons.

Notable people

 William S. "Bill" Heatly, a Democratic member of the Texas House of Representatives from 1955 to 1983, was known as the "Duke of Paducah". A sculpture of his bust is located on the west side of the Cottle County Courthouse

References

External links
 Paducah Chamber of Commerce
 Paducah Independent School District
 Cottle County website
  Cottle County in Handbook of Texas Online at the University of North Texas
 Cottle, George Washington (1811–1836)
 Historical Marker – Cottle County
 Historical Marker – Cottle County
 Historical Marker – Cottle County Courthouse

Towns in Cottle County, Texas
Towns in Texas
County seats in Texas